Sekunjalo Investment Holdings (parent company of African Equity Empowerment Investments) is a black owned South Africa-based private equity firm specializing in acquisitions, PIPEs, and buyouts. It has principal operations in publishing, Internet, fishing, healthcare, pharmaceuticals, telecommunication, financial services, aquaculture, biotechnology, enterprise development, events management, travel.  The company was founded by Iqbal Survé in 1996 with the aim of investing and assisting Black-owned businesses. In April 2015 all of Sekunjalo's investments except its 55% ownership in Independent Media SA was spun-off into a new company, still owned by Sekunjalo Investments, known as African Equity Empowerment Investments (AEEI).

Business model 
Sekunjalo's Investment model is to seek above average returns in their portfolio and to have scalable social impact especially on the African continent. The Group is committed to the "upliftment of previously marginalised groups by creating employment, emphasising development and transferring of skills."

Transformation and Black Economic Empowerment 
Sekunjalo was founded in 1996 after Nelson Mandela, South Africa's first democratically-elected President, called on black South Africans to play a role in the economic transformation of the country. The Group is responsible for around 8 000 jobs in South Africa today.

African Equity Empowerment Investments 
In April 2015, Sekunjalo Investments Limited (SIL) was renamed, African Equity Empowerment Investments (AEEI) to avoid confusion with its parent company, Sekunjalo Investment Holdings (SIH). SIH became a privately held company whilst AEEI took Sekunjalo's publicly traded status on the Johannesburg Stock Exchange trading under the ticker AEE. The ownership of subsidiaries was restructured so as to "better reflect the underlying businesses and investments of the Group going forward and to differentiate from the private holding company."  Founder Iqbal Survé stepped down from managing all investments held by AEEI so as to focus on the company's media holdings.

Independent Media 
Sekunjalo Independent Media Consortium is a privately owned and separately controlled segment company that is not directly related to the publicly listed African Equity Empowerment Investments segment of the Sekunjalo Investments parent company.  Sekunjalo holds 55% ownership of Cape Town-based Independent News and Media South Africa (INMSA) with the remaining ownership made up of Chinese and Public Investment Corporation of South Africa (a South African government owned company). Two Chinese State Owned Enterprises (China International Television Corporation and the China Africa Development Fund) invested R400 million in the deal to acquire 20% of the Newspaper.  The Public Investment Corporation of South Africa invested R500 million to acquire a 25% share. The purchase of the South African-based media group from Independent News and Media was concluded in August 2013 for €150-million (R2 billion). Sekunjalo Independent Media's 55% purchase of INMSA was largely funded by a loan from the Public Investment Corporation (PIC) and Government Employees Pension Fund. In 2019 Sekunjalo claimed that the PIC and Sekunjalo had come to an amicable agreement for a debt-for-shares swop in 2018, while other sources reported that a large proportion of the PIC's investment in Sekunjalo were written off.

Investments 

 Independent News and Media SA (55% ownership)
 Independent Online (South Africa)
 The Star (South Africa)
 Saturday Star
 Daily Voice (South African newspaper)
 Cape Times 
 Cape Argus
 Weekend Argus
 Business Report
 Sunday Independent
 Pretoria News
 Weekend Pretoria News
 The Post
 Sunday Tribune (South Africa)
 The Mercury
 Daily News
 Diamond Fields Advertiser
 Isolezwe
 African News Agency

African Equity Empowerment Investments 

 Genius Biotherapeutics (Pty) Ltd: pharmaceutical research and production
 Ribotech: pharmaceuticals (cancer drugs) 
 Sekpharma: vitamin supplements and other pharmaceutical products
 Wynberg Pharmaceuticals 

 AYO Technology Solutions

 Premier Fishing: fishing
 Marine Growers (Atlantic Abalone): aquaculture - focus on abalone cultivation

AEEI has strategic investments in the following companies in South Africa:
 British Telecomms South Africa: a South African subsidiary of BT Group - not any longer 
 SAAB South Africa: a South African subsidiary of SAAB Group
 Pioneer Foods: processed foods

AEEI has strategic investments in the following companies in South Africa:
 espAfrika: events management 
 Enterprise Development: tourism services

In the news

Sekunjalo Marine Services Consortium tender 
In December 2011 a Sekunjalo subsidiary, Sekunjalo Marine Services Consortium, was awarded an R800 million (equivalent to roughly US$98 million in 2011) tender for the crewing, management and maintenance of the research and fisheries patrol services.

On 19 February 2012, Mr Pieter van Dalen, the Democratic Alliance member of parliament, lodged a complaint with the Public Protector. To investigate allegation of improper awards of this tender by the Department of Agriculture Forestry and Fisheries. That "the company had submitted four separate bids under different company and consortium names, which were all accompanied by Sekunjalo’s 2010 annual report."  Additional concerns were raised over possible conflict of interests that neither the company nor the Department of Agriculture Forestry and Fisheries adequately addressed over one of its holdings, Premier Fishing, also having a fishing licence at the time when the contract was awarded.

On 5 December 2013, the South African Public Protector released its report on accusations that the contract to manage South Africa's fleet of fishing patrol vessels was improperly handled and awarded to Sekunjalo's Marine Service Consortium. The report found that the awarding of the R800 million a year contract was improper and did not comply with the department of Agriculture, Forestry and Fisheries supply-chain management requirements.  The Public Protector found that the head of the department's tender evaluation had been "irrational, biased and improper" in its awarding of the bid to Sekunjalo.

In the final report, the Public Protector was unable to find any improper maladministration by the Department of Agriculture Forestry and Fisheries on the allegation that submitting four tenders under the Sekunjalo Group constitute collusive tendering. Therefore, Sekunjalo was cleared of charges of collusion and corruption, the Public Protector referred the matter to the Competition Commission. The Competition Commission found that there was no collusive bidding by four entities of the Sekunjalo Group when they each put in a bid for an R800 million tender.

The contract was previously held by rival marine services firm Smit Amandla Marine until it expired in 2011 and a new bidding process started.  Smit Amand Marine complained that its contract bid application had been leaked to Sekunjalo.  The contract was initially awarded to Sekunjalo only to withdraw it and instead gave Smit Amandla one month to hand over their operation to the South African Navy.  The department then found that the Navy could not properly maintain the fleet of six patrol vessels and issued an emergency tender to Nautic SA and Damen Shipyards.

Accusations of undue interference at the Cape Times 

On 5 December 2013 former president and struggle hero of South Africa Nelson Mandela passed away. Most newspapers in South Africa, and major international newspaper titles dedicated their front pages to coverage of Mandela's death.  Except for Die Burger and the Sekunjalo owned Cape Times which instead led with a special edition that wrapped around the regular edition covering Mandela's death that was regarded by TIME magazine as one of the best covers from around the world on the event.  On 6 December 2013, the day after Mandela's death and at the same time other publications were covering the event, the Cape Times led with a front-page article on the Public Protector's report highlighting irregularities in the awarding of the Sekunjalo Marine Services Consortium tender. The same day, the newspaper's editor, Alide Dasnois, was dismissed from her post by Iqbal Survé, executive chairman of Sekunjalo Investments. One of the stated reasons by Survé for Dasnois's dismissal was that Mandela's death was not on the front page of the Cape Times.

Sekunjalo Investments has threatened to sue the paper, Dasnois, and journalist Melanie Gosling over the tender story, but Survé has denied that Dasnois' removal was connected to the article. He instead pointed to the title's declining circulation figures as his primary motivation. Compounded loss of sales, between 2008 and 2012, amounted to 28%, he said. The Cape Times is one of the titles in the Sekunjalo owned INMSA stable.

In response to a perceived attack on press freedom, several organizations have issued statements of support for Dasnois and of concern over editorial independence at the Cape Times. These include Index on Censorship, the International Federation of Journalists, the SA Centre for PEN International, the SA National Editors Forum, the Freedom of Expression Institute, and the Right2Know campaign.

In September 2014 Dasnois filed papers in the South African Labour Court for unfair dismissal and for breach of contract.  In May 2016 Sekunjalo reached an agreement with Dasnois to settle out of court and issued a statement that acknowledged that Dasnois did not show disrespect to Mandela's legacy and neither was her conduct in any way motivated by racism.  Shortly after releasing this statement the Sekunjalo owned Cape Times newspaper ran a story that Dasnois's lawyer claims sought to accuse Dasnois of being disrespectful to Mandela.

Accusations of pro-ANC bias 
In January 2015 the company and its director Iqbal Survé were accused of pro-African National Congress (ANC) political bias in how they operated Independent News and Media SA and its subsidiary newspapers such as the Cape Times.  Although there had been lingering concerns over press freedom at Independent Media following Skunjalo's acquisition of the company partly due to the 2014 firing of Cape Times editor Alide Dasnois and partly due to Survé's close relationship with the ANC the catalyst for the accusation was "group Executive Editor Karima Brown and Editor of Opinion and Analysis Vukani Mde's decision to wear ANC colours at an ANC rally."  The accusations were first made by former Independent News columnist Max du Preez in his open resignation letter as reasons for his refusal to work for the company any longer.

Karima Brown, the Chief Content Officer of Independent Media replied to Du Preez's resignation letter by rejecting accusations of political bias, as their publications still feature a number of articles critical of the ANC government, claimed that Du Preez had inaccurately accused Schabir Shaik and President Jacob Zuma of pursuing a corrupt relationship, and that Du Preez and those who have supported him were motivated by racism.

Opposition leader Helen Zille stated that Skunjalo's operation of Independent media was an example of state capture that threatens both the independence of the media and the development of democracy in South Africa.

The company was again criticised for its close links with the ANC and of allegedly having an anti-Democratic Alliance (DA) bias in a report on Al-Jazeera in March 2016.  The DA for its part was accused of trying to silence criticism from the Cape Times by threatening to cancel the City of Cape Town's subscription to that publication.  In the same report the Cape Times rejected any accusation that it or any Sekunjalo owned publication was reporting unfairly towards any opposition political party.

In 2012, prior to the purchase of Independent Media South Africa, Sekunjalo entered into an agreement with the Gupta family (a family best known for their relationship with ANC president Jacob Zuma) owned Oakbay Investments to purchase 50% of the newspaper company after Sekunjalo had completed the purchase from the company's original owner.  This agreement fell through and led to a court case being brought against Sekunjalo by Oakbay.

Chinese censorship 

Former Independent Media columnist Azad Essa said that the newspaper cancelled his column immediately after he published a column distributed to a number of Independent Media newspapers critical of China's mass internment of ethnic Uighurs.  Essa was also informed that the article he wrote would not be published online.  Essa went on to accuse the newspaper group owned by both Sekunjalo and Chinese interests of espousing "sycophantic praise for Chinese investment, lacks critical engagement with the much-ballyhooed BRICS... and fails to ask basic questions on Chinese motives in Africa."

Public Investment Corporation investment
Spurred on by a series of letters by United Democratic Movement leader Bantu Holomisa, in 2018 President Cyril Ramaphosa established the Public Investment Corporation Commission (aka as the PIC or Mpati Commission) which was chaired by retired Judge Lex Mpati. The commission was set up to investigate allegations of impropriety regarding the Public Investment Corporation.

There were accusations that PIC executives bypassed normal processes to invest R4.3 billion of public money into Sekunjalo Investments subsidiary company AYO Technology Solutions. The Companies and Intellectual Properties Commission (CIPC) instructed the PIC to recoup to recoup the R4.3 billion investment it made into AYO Technology Solutions in 2017 by issuing a Compliance Notice against the board of directors of the Public Investment Corporation (PIC). The notice was declared unlawful by Judge Cornelius van der Westhuizen at the North Gauteng High Court as the PIC was not given a hearing before the issuance of the Compliance Notice.

The PIC Commission of Inquiry Report  does not have a heading named “findings” against The Sekunjalo Group, like it does against other companies it investigated in the same report. Hence the Sekunjalo Group took exception to the PIC Commission's report having made unfounded statements in relation to the Group that were not supported by any evidence.

Bank account closures 
In 2021 and 2022, banks in South Africa issued notices indicating termination of banking services to the company. Absa, Investec and FNB all closed their accounts with Sekunjalo subsidiaries after the bad press and “reputational risk” that came with the Mpati report. The banks cited the high risk of doing business with the Sekunjalo Group following the publication of an inquiry by Judge Lex Mpati into irregularities at the Public Investment Corporation. The banks' decision in this regard has been fought vehemently by the Sekunjalo Group, most notably by means of a lawsuit in the country's Equality Court, which challenges the discriminatory tactics and dominance of the largest banks in South African's banking sector.

On 17 June 2022, the Sekunjalo Group won an interim interdict against Nedbank preventing the bank from closing its bank accounts. Nedbank was also asked to reopen any accounts previously closed and that these accounts operate on the same terms and conditions as previously agreed upon. Nedbank was also ordered to pay Sekunjalo's legal costs. As of February 2023, the case continues in the Supreme Court of Appeal.

See also 
 List of South African media

References

External links
 Corporate Website

Companies listed on the Johannesburg Stock Exchange
Financial services companies established in 1996
Companies based in Cape Town
Mass media companies of South Africa
Articles containing video clips
Investment management companies of South Africa